Women's handball at the 2002 Asian Games was held in Changwon Gymnasium, Changwon, South Korea from October 1 to October 12, 2002.

Squads

Results
All times are Korea Standard Time (UTC+09:00)

Final standing

References

Results
Results

External links
Official website

Women